Gala González (born March 16, 1986) is a Spanish model, socialite, blogger, fashion designer and DJ. She is the first Spanish fashion blogger.
She is the niece of Spanish designer Adolfo Domínguez.

Early life
González was born in A Coruña, Galicia, Spain. Her family is involved in fashion, Galician fashion designer Adolfo Domínguez. González studied at University of the Arts London where she graduated with a BA in fashion.

Career
She began blogging in 2007 following the success of her fotolog.

González has worked as the creative director of Línea U by Adolfo Domínguez since 2007. During September 2009, Gala released her own first collection: Music Collection for the Spanish label Adolfo Dominguez. In June 2010 she was cast for Loewe's campaign.

Personal life
She currently lives in Madrid.

References

External links

1986 births
Living people
Spanish socialites
Spanish bloggers
Spanish fashion designers
Spanish female models
Businesspeople from Galicia (Spain)
Spanish women bloggers
Fashion influencers
Spanish women fashion designers